The Illinois Terminal is an intermodal passenger transport center located at 45 East University Avenue in Champaign, Illinois, United States. The facility opened in January 1999, and provides Amtrak train service and various bus services to the Champaign-Urbana area.

Facilities
Owned by the Champaign-Urbana Mass Transit District, the building also houses a Subway restaurant and the offices of the Junior League, as well as a school, meeting spaces, and banquet halls. It formerly housed the Champaign office for Mike Frerichs when he represented Champaign-Urbana in the Illinois Senate.

Illinois Terminal was built with funds provided by the Federal Transit Administration, Illinois Department of Transportation, the Champaign-Urbana Mass Transit District and the city of Champaign, and was named for the Illinois Terminal Railroad, an electric interurban line that ran from Champaign, and at one time extended as far as St. Louis. The track and platforms of the Illinois Terminal are owned by the Canadian National Railway, which acquired the Illinois Central Railroad in 1999. Previously, trains stopped at the Illinois Central Railroad Depot, built in 1898 across University Avenue from the site of the current station.

There is a short term parking lot in front of the building with long term parking available off Water Street east of the tracks.

Services
The facility is used by the following transportation companies:
Amtrak (second floor)
Burlington Trailways
Champaign-Urbana Mass Transit District
Greyhound Lines
Peoria Charter
Danville Mass Transit

References

External links

Champaign-Urbana Amtrak Station (USA Rail Guide -- Train Web)

Amtrak stations in Illinois
Railway stations in the United States opened in 1999
Buildings and structures in Champaign, Illinois
Transportation buildings and structures in Champaign County, Illinois
Bus stations in Illinois